Frans Pauwels (8 September 1918 – 24 January 2001) was a Dutch racing cyclist. He rode in the 1948 and 1949 Tour de France.

References

External links
 

1918 births
2001 deaths
Dutch male cyclists
Cyclists from East Flanders
People from Beveren
20th-century Dutch people